General Sir Edwin Beaumont Johnson  (4 July 1825 – 18 June 1893) was a British Army officer who served as Adjutant-General in India.

Military career
Educated at Addiscombe Military Seminary, Johnson was commissioned into the Bengal artillery on 10 June 1842. He fought at the Battle of Ferozeshah in December 1845 and the Battle of Sobraon in February 1846 during the First Anglo-Sikh War as well as the Battle of Chillianwala in January 1849 and the Battle of Gujrat in February 1849 during the Second Anglo-Sikh War. He served as assistant adjutant-general at the Siege of Lucknow in Autumn 1857 during the Indian Rebellion. He became Quartermaster-General in India in July 1873, Adjutant-General in India in March 1874 and a member of council of the Secretary of State for India in October 1874. He went on to be Military Member of the Governor-General of India's Council in March 1877 and Director-General of Military Education at the War Office in December 1884 before retiring in January 1891.

References

British Army generals
1825 births
1893 deaths
Knights Grand Cross of the Order of the Bath
Companions of the Order of the Indian Empire
Military personnel from Somerset